Kalama (1817–1870) was a Queen Consort of Hawaii.

Kalama may also refer to:

Kalama, Washington, a city in Cowlitz County, Washington
Kalama Atoll, Hawaiian name for Johnston Atoll
Kalama Sutta, a Buddhist scripture
Kamalatmika/Kalama, a Hindu Goddess
Kalama (bug), a genus of heteropteran bugs

People with the surname
Benny Kalama Falsetto singer and musician from Hawaii
Dave Kalama, Hawaiian big wave surfer, windsurfer, and celebrity watersports enthusiast
Simon P. Kalama (died 1875), Hawaiian politician and engraver

Places
Kālāma, an Iron Age Indo-Aryan tribe

See also
Calama (disambiguation)
Kalamai (disambiguation)